Wulan Tuolehazi (born 5 March 1993 ) is a Chinese professional boxer who challenged for the WBO flyweight title in 2019.

Early life
Wulan born on 5 March 1993 into an ethnic Kazakh family of herdsmen in Xibert village, Emin County, Tacheng Prefecture, Xinjiang Uygur Autonomous Region in northwest China. At one point his parents owned 200 sheep and 20 cattle. He learned to ride a horse at the age of five, and began school at age seven. He began freestyle wrestling in 2007 while in primary school, but switched over to boxing the following year after he was spotted by Tang Bo, head boxing coach at the Ürümqi Sports School. Coming from a poor background, he hoped to make enough money by fighting in order to support his family.

He represented Ürümqi at the 2010 Xinjiang National Games, winning a gold medal. The following year he represented Xinjiang at the National Youth Championships, finishing as runner-up to national team member He Junjun. Even though he had switched sports, he also practiced Greco-Roman wrestling, winning a Xinjiang Youth Greco-Roman Championship. After graduating from the sports school, he temporarily gave up boxing to attend Xinjiang Normal University, where he opened a boxing club. During his third year of studies he accepted his first offer for a professional boxing match.

In his amateur career, he won the Xinjiang championship five times.

Professional career
With little connections on the professional scene, Wulan began his career with inexperienced management and poor matchmaking. After fighting at light flyweight during his amateur career, Wulan made his professional debut on 28 November 2015 at super bantamweight, losing by unanimous decision (UD) after eight rounds against 19-year-old Jian Wang in Suzhou. Only a few weeks later he was defeated in his second bout against Van Thao Tran in South Korea. After two wins, he lost to Xian Qian Wei by way of UD on 21 October 2016, dropping to 2–3. He joined Team M23 and Quanwei Sihai Promotions in May 2017, dropping to a more natural flyweight class. On 5 May 2018 he knocked down former world champion Kwanthai Sithmorseng three times in four rounds, improving his record to 7–3–1. He defeated Watana Phenbaan by fourth-round technical knockout (TKO) in Qingdao on 27 July 2018 to win the interim WBO Asia Pacific flyweight title, his first regional belt. Two months later he handed undefeated Filipino youngster Jayr Raquinel his first career loss to take the vacant WBC Silver flyweight title, being favored unanimously by the judges in Changsha with scores of 117–111, 116–111 and 116–111. The bout was rated three out of five stars by AlltheBestFights.com as one of the top fights of the year, and Wulan entered the top 10 of the WBC rankings in February 2019.

On 30 March 2019 Wulan faced Japanese prospect Ryota Yamauchi in Shanghai for the vacant WBA International flyweight title. He dropped Yamauchi with a right uppercut in the third round en route to a UD victory (117–109, 117–109 and 115–112), although he was also knocked down in the fight. The bout was given three out of five stars by AlltheBestFights.com. He retained his belt two months later on 26 May against Ardin Diale, and again on 17 October with a fifth-round stoppage of Satoshi Tanaka for his eighth consecutive victory. On New Year's Eve 2019, he unsuccessfully challenged Kosei Tanaka in Tokyo for the WBO flyweight title. The world champion hit Wulan with a devastating three-piece combo of uppercuts late in the third round that kept him on the mat for about two minutes. Wulan rebounded from his unsuccessful title challenge with a sixth-round technical knockout victory over Jomar Fajardo in Bangkok on 8 March 2020.

Professional boxing record

Personal life
Hailing from the Xinjiang Uygur Autonomous Region, he does not speak fluent Mandarin and currently lives in Emin County.

References

External links
 
 Wulan Tuolehazi at Boxing Empire 

Living people
1993 births
Chinese male boxers
Flyweight boxers
Sportspeople from Xinjiang
People from Tacheng
People from Ürümqi
Chinese people of Kazakhstani descent